Actinodaphne albifrons is a species of plant in the family Lauraceae. It is endemic to Sri Lanka.

References

Flora of Sri Lanka
albifrons
Vulnerable plants
Taxonomy articles created by Polbot
Plants described in 1971